The Lancashire Raptors were a British ice hockey team based in Blackburn, Lancashire. They were members of the English National Ice Hockey League, and have played in the North 2 division. Their home ice was the 3,200-seat Blackburn Arena.

History 
In April 2007, the English Ice Hockey Association restructured the age limits for competing players, reclassifying the under 19 age limit as under 18. This left many 19-year-old players in the country without a team to play for regularly. One such team affected was the Blackburn Ice Hockey Development Association (BIHDA), the junior development programme for the Blackburn Hawks; those that were deemed not good enough to play for the Hawks were left with the choice of either recreational hockey or giving up on the sport. This is where the Blackburn Junior Hawks committee stepped in with the decision to set up a second senior team playing at the Arena alongside the Hawks.
This team, unlike the Hawks, would get no funding from the Arena: the players would primarily fund the team through monthly subs on the same basis as the junior teams.

Mark Ward was selected to be the Raptors coach after expressing his interest in running the team, which, alongside his wealth of knowledge of the sport, having been a previous coach of the Hawks and many years of playing, made him the ideal man for the job.  

The Raptors completed four seasons in the ENIHL North Division 2, following the split in the league for 2008–09. The start of the 2011–12 campaign saw a mass exodus of players to the new Subzero Ice Rink in nearby Cleveleys to play as part of the newly formed Fylde Flyers club. Following the departure of long-standing coach Mark Ward, new coach Gary Buckman, also formerly a coach for the Blackburn Hawks, joined the Raptors setup. The Spirit of the Raptors was to bring through young players from the Blackburn Junior Hawks program into fully fledged senior league players with the assistance of experienced veteran senior league players in their ranks. Offering experience and guidance with the aim of these junior players playing at a senior level with the Raptors first and then becoming future Blackburn Hawks.

Season-by-season Record 
Note: GP = Games played, W = Wins, L = Losses, T = Ties, Pts = Points, GF = Goals for, GA = Goals against, PIM = Penalties in minutes.

Current squad 2011-12 
1 Matt Milhench (N/M)
1 Matt Phair (N/M) 
2 Patrick Thomson 
3 Wesley Nixon 
4 Ryan Hindle
5 Paul Burns 
6 Nick Saxton (N/M)  
7 Darren Shaw
8 Christian Wareing
9 Ken Armstrong 
10 Michael Vigelskas 
11 Steven Hetherington
12 Ben Abbott
13 Jack Skipp 
14 Josh Lee 
15 Paul Mercer 
16 Tom Helm
17 Christopher Preston
18 Craig Summerill 
19 Anthony Kinder
20 Curtis Elliott   
21 Troy Evans
22 Michael Alexander

External links
Lancashire Raptors, Official Website

References

Ice hockey teams in England
Sport in Blackburn